Fajja was a Palestinian town located 15 kilometers northeast of Jaffa. Depopulated and destroyed during the Arab-Israeli war, its land area is today part of the Israeli city of Petah Tikva.

History
Pottery remains from the Chalcolithic, Middle Bronze II, Iron, Persian and Roman eras have been found here.

Winepresses, dated to the Roman/Byzantine era (5th and 6th century) have been excavated here, and pottery remains from the Byzantine era have also been found.

Pottery from the early Islamic period (eighth–tenth centuries CE) have been excavated here, as has glass artefacts from the early Umayyad era, and ceramic jugs from the Abbasid era.

Ceramic vessels dating to the  twelfth–thirteenth centuries CE (ie Crusader or Ayyubid  era) "including a glazed yellow bowl with an incised decoration that may represent a Latin letter" have also been found.

Ottoman era
In 1856 the village was named el−Fejjeh on Kiepert's map of Palestine published that year. 

In 1870,  Victor Guérin found the village  to be divided into two quarters, each with its own Sheikh. He estimated it to  have 300 inhabitants, while an Ottoman  village list from about  the same year found that Fajja had  a population of 110, in 35 houses, though the population count only included men.

In 1882, the PEF's Survey of Western Palestine (SWP) described Fajja as a small village built of adobe bricks.

British Mandate era

In the 1922 census of Palestine, conducted by the British Mandate authorities, Fajjeh had a population of 164, all Muslims, increasing sharply in the 1931 census, to 707, still all Muslims, in a total of 165 houses.

The town had one elementary school, founded in 1922. By 1945 it had 181 students, including 10 females.

In the 1945 statistics, Fajja had 1,200 Muslim inhabitants, in addition to 370 Jews, and a total land area of 4,419 dunams. Of this, a total of 768 dunams was used for citrus and bananas, 61 dunams were irrigated or used for orchards, 3,863 used for cereals, while 7 dunams were classified as built-up areas.

1948, aftermath
In early April, the villagers of Fajja sued for a truce with their Jewish neighbours. Again, after the  Deir Yassin massacre, the villagers of Fajja contacted their Jewish neighbours and promised "quiet".
It was conquered by the Haganah and Irgun on May 15, 1948 without any resistance. Most of the Arab inhabitants fled the town before its capture by Israeli forces due to alleged attacks by the Irgun on February 17. In June 1948, the town was demolished based on the recommendation of Yosef Weitz of the Jewish National Fund. Most of the town's land is currently a part of the jurisdiction of the city of Petah Tikva.

In 1992 the village site was described: "The village has been completely razed except for one house and a pond. Eucalyptus trees and cactuses further mark the site. The surrounding land is partly occupied by buildings; the rest is cultivated."

See also
Kfar Avraham
Depopulated Palestinian locations in Israel
List of villages depopulated during the Arab-Israeli conflict

Footnotes

Bibliography

 
 

 
 
 
 

 
 (pp.  314, 342, 349,  350)

External links 
Palestine Remembered - Fajja
Fajja, Zochrot
Survey of Western Palestine, Map 13: IAA,  Wikimedia commons
Fajja from the Khalil Sakakini Cultural Center

Arab villages depopulated prior to the 1948 Arab–Israeli War
District of Jaffa